Kinelsky District is an administrative and municipal district (raion), one of the twenty-seven in Samara Oblast, Russia. It is located in the center of the oblast. Its administrative center is the town of Kinel (which is not administratively a part of the district). Population: 33,258 (2010 Census);

Administrative and municipal status
Within the framework of administrative divisions, Kinelsky District is one of the twenty-seven in the oblast. The town of Kinel serves as its administrative center, despite being incorporated separately as a town of oblast significance—an administrative unit with the status equal to that of the districts.

As a municipal division, the district is incorporated as Kinelsky Municipal District. The town of oblast significance of Kinel is incorporated separately from the district as Kinel Urban Okrug.

References

Notes

Sources

Districts of Samara Oblast
